Chah Salem (also Romanized as Chāh Sālem; also known as Chāy-e Sālem) is a village in Chah Salem Rural District, in the Central District of Omidiyeh County, Khuzestan Province, Iran. At the 2006 census, its population was 2,406, in 454 families.

References 

Populated places in Omidiyeh County